Summit Hill High School was a high school located at Summit Hill, Pennsylvania in Carbon County, Pennsylvania in the Lehigh Valley region of the state. 

The school was built in 1911 and is a three-story, "H"-shaped, school building in the Renaissance Revival style.  It is constructed of structural terra cotta and faced with Roman brick. It measures approximately 122 feet wide and 82 feet deep.  The school closed in the late 1960s and was renovated into apartments in 1997.

It was added to the National Register of Historic Places in 2001.

References

School buildings on the National Register of Historic Places in Pennsylvania
Renaissance Revival architecture in Pennsylvania
School buildings completed in 1911
Buildings and structures in Carbon County, Pennsylvania
National Register of Historic Places in Carbon County, Pennsylvania
1911 establishments in Pennsylvania